Frederick Paul Draper II (September 2, 1923 – December 26, 1999) was an American film and television actor. He was roommates in New York City with Harry Mastrogeorge and John Cassavetes while attending The American Academy of Dramatic Arts, New York with Grace Kelly, Anne Bancroft and others. He graduated May 1, 1950. He appeared on numerous television programs and films.

Born in Chester, Pennsylvania, he appeared in four films directed by Cassavetes, Faces, Husbands, A Woman Under the Influence, and Opening Night. He also played different roles in six episodes of the Peter Falk detective series Columbo.

Filmography

Death
He retired to Rancho Cucamonga, California, where he died at age 76.

Reference

External links

Profile, aada.org
Profile, seeing-stars.com

1923 births
1999 deaths
American male film actors
American male television actors
People from Chester, Pennsylvania
People from Rancho Cucamonga, California
20th-century American male actors